Ivory Coast sent a delegation to compete at the 2008 Summer Paralympics in Beijing, People's Republic of China.

Sports

Athletics

Men's track

Powerlifting

See also
Ivory Coast at the Paralympics
Ivory Coast at the 2008 Summer Olympics

External links
International Paralympic Committee

Nations at the 2008 Summer Paralympics
2008
Summer Paralympics